Enterococcus moraviensis is a species of Enterococcus with type strain CCM 4856T (= LMG 19486T).

References

Further reading

External links

LPSN
Type strain of Enterococcus moraviensis at BacDive -  the Bacterial Diversity Metadatabase

moraviensis
Bacteria described in 2001